Reality is the second and final studio album by American pop group Dream. The album did not see a wide release and was only released for digital download in 2003 from the French Virgin Megastore website; it remained unreleased elsewhere until 2008, when it became available on the United States iTunes Store.

Production
Dream returned to the recording studio to work on the follow-up to It Was All a Dream in late 2001. For this album, Dream teamed up with producers such as Scott Storch, Sean Combs, Darkchild and The Underdogs. Halfway through the recording process, Melissa Schuman left Dream to pursue acting in April 2002 and was replaced by Kasey Sheridan in the early fall of 2002. Production was completed by early 2003.

Release and promotion
Dream returned to the music scene with a sexier image in June 2003 with the release of the album's first single, "Crazy" (featuring Loon). The song did not receive the acclaim and popularity of the group's debut single "He Loves U Not" and its accompanying music video caused controversy due to member Kasey Sheridan's provocative dancing because many thought she was too young to be dancing in a suggestive way (she was only 16 years old at the time, while the other members were 17–18 years old).

Reality was originally due for a May 2003 release but was pushed back numerous times (including an October 28, 2003 release schedule) until, ultimately, Dream were dropped from Bad Boy Records. Because of this, plans for "That's OK" (featuring Fabulous) to be released as a second single were also cancelled. Reality was only released for purchase from the French Virgin Megastore website and on May 13, 2008, Reality became available for digital purchase on the United States iTunes Store. The album has since been removed off the iTunes Store for unknown reasons.

Track listing

^ Not included on the iTunes version of the album.

References

External links
 Dream's official Bad Boy Records site – The Dream Site

2003 albums
Albums produced by Rodney Jerkins
Albums produced by Scott Storch
Dream (American group) albums